When in Rome... is a 1988 live album by the Penguin Cafe Orchestra, and was recorded at The Royal Festival Hall, London, on 9 July 1987. It was produced by Simon Jeffes and published by E.G. Records. The cover painting is by Emily Young.

The CD edition included four extra tracks not featured on the LP edition.

LP release
Side 1
 "Air a Danser" (5:17)
 "Yodel 1" (4:46)
 "From the Colonies" (3:30)
 "Southern Jukebox Music" (4:53)
 "Numbers 1 to 4" (7:44)

Side 2
 "Beanfields" (4:28)
 "Paul's Dance" (2:19)
 "Oscar Tango" (3:20)
 "Music for a Found Harmonium" (3:18)
 "Isle of View (Music for Helicopter Pilots)" (4:39)
 "Prelude and Yodel" (3:56)
 "Giles Farnaby's Dream" (4:13)

CD release
 "Air a Danser" (5:17)
 "Yodel 1" (4:46)
 "Cutting Branches for a Temporary Shelter" (2:27)
 "From the Colonies" (3:30)
 "Southern Jukebox Music" (4:53)
 "Numbers 1 to 4" (7:44)
 "Telephone and Rubber Band" (4:05)
 "Air" (4:00)
 "Beanfields" (4:28)
 "Paul's Dance" (2:19)
 "Oscar Tango" (3:20)
 "Music for a Found Harmonium" (3:18)
 "Isle of View (Music for Helicopter Pilots)" (4:39)
 "Prelude and Yodel" (3:56)
 "Dirt" (5:27)
 "Giles Farnaby's Dream" (4:13)

Personnel
Simon Jeffes - Guitar, Pianica (3), Bass (5, 12, 15), Cuatro (7, 10, 16), Ukelele (4, 9), Electric Guitar (13, 14)

Helen Liebmann - Cello
Bob Loveday - Violin
Ian Maidman - Percussion, Bass (1), Cuatro (10)
Steve Nye - Piano, Electric Piano, Harmonium, Cuatro (10)
Neil Rennie - Ukelele, Cuatro (1, 9)
Geoffrey Richardson - Viola, Bass (2), Mandolin (9), Ukelele (10), Cuatro (14), Electric Guitar/Penny Whistles (15)
Julio Segovia - Percussion
Paul Street - Cuatro, Ukelele (4, 7, 9), Guitar (10, 13, 14)

References

1988 live albums
Penguin Cafe Orchestra albums
Albums produced by Simon Jeffes
E.G. Records live albums

fr:Penguin Cafe Orchestra (album)